The 2018 FIVB Volleyball Men's Challenger Cup was the inaugural edition of the FIVB Volleyball Men's Challenger Cup, a new annual men's international volleyball tournament contested by 6 national teams that acts as a qualifier for the FIVB Volleyball Men's Nations League. The tournament was held in Matosinhos, Portugal from 20 to 24 June 2018.

Portugal won the title, defeating Czech Republic in the final, and earned the right to participate in the 2019 Nations League replacing South Korea, the last placed challenger team after the 2018 edition. Estonia defeated Cuba in the 3rd place match.

Qualification

A total of 6 teams qualified for the tournament.

Pools composition
Teams were seeded following the serpentine system according to their FIVB World Ranking as of 7 July 2017. FIVB reserved the right to seed the hosts as head of pool A regardless of the World Ranking. Rankings are shown in brackets except the hosts who ranked 30th.

Squads

Venue
 Centro de Desportos e Congressos de Matosinhos, Matosinhos, Portugal

Pool standing procedure
 Number of matches won
 Match points
 Sets ratio
 Points ratio
 Result of the last match between the tied teams

Match won 3–0 or 3–1: 3 match points for the winner, 0 match points for the loser
Match won 3–2: 2 match points for the winner, 1 match point for the loser

Preliminary round
All times are Western European Summer Time (UTC+01:00).

Pool A

|}

|}

Pool B

|}

|}

Final round
All times are Western European Summer Time (UTC+01:00).

Semifinals
|}

3rd place match
|}

Final
|}

Final standing

See also
2018 FIVB Volleyball Men's Nations League
2018 FIVB Volleyball Women's Challenger Cup

References

External links
Fédération Internationale de Volleyball – official website
2018 Challenger Cup – official website

FIVB Volleyball Men's Challenger Cup
FIVB
2018 in Portuguese sport
International volleyball competitions hosted by Portugal
FIVB Volleyball Men's Challenger Cup
Sport in Matosinhos